Le Claire, LeClair, LeClaire or Leclair is a French or Francophone surname which can refer to:

 Antoine Le Claire (1797–1861), U.S. Army interpreter, founded Davenport, Iowa
 Corinne Leclair (born 1970), Mauritian swimmer
 Day Leclaire, American author
 Denise LeClair Cobb, American former CNN Headline News anchor
 Didier Leclair (born 1967), Canadian francophone fiction writer
 Frank J. LeClair (1888-1974), American commercial fisherman and politician
 Jean-Marie Leclair, also known as Jean-Marie Leclair the Elder, (1697–1764), French Baroque violinist and composer
 Jean-Marie Leclair the younger (1703–1777), French composer, the younger brother of the better-known Jean-Marie Leclair the Elder
 Harold LeClair Ickes (1874–1952), U.S. administrator and political figure and former Secretary of the Interior (1933 to 1946)
 Jack LeClair (born 1929), Canadian former ice hockey player
 Jim LeClair (1950–2019), American football player
 John LeClair (born 1969), American former professional ice hockey player
 Judith LeClair (born 1958), American bassoonist
 Keith LeClair, American college baseball coach
 Maurice LeClair (born 1927) Canadian physician, businessman, civil servant, and academic
 Pierre-Julien Leclair (1860– after 1896), Canadian politician
 Edme-Jean Leclaire (1801–1872), French economist and businessman
 Pascal Leclaire (born 1982), Canadian ice hockey player
 Richard A. LeClair (born 1991), U.S. Army Special Agent, Military Police Soldier

Places
 LeClaire Park, Davenport, Iowa, US
 Le Claire, Iowa, US

Buildings
 LeClaire Apartments, listed on the National Register of Historic Places in Florida
 LeClaire Hotel, listed on the National Register of Historic Places in Illinois

See also 
 LeClerc (surname)

French-language surnames